Tourettism refers to the presence of Tourette-like symptoms in the absence of Tourette syndrome, as the result of other diseases or conditions, known as "secondary causes".

Tourette syndrome (TS) is an inherited neurological condition of multiple motor and at least one vocal tic.   Although Tourette syndrome is the most common cause of tic disorders, other sporadic, genetic, and neurodegenerative disorders may also exhibit tics.

Conditions that may manifest tics or stereotyped movements include developmental disorders; autism spectrum disorders and stereotypic movement disorder; Sydenham's chorea; idiopathic dystonia; and genetic conditions such as Huntington's disease, neuroacanthocytosis, pantothenate kinase-associated neurodegeneration, Duchenne muscular dystrophy, Wilson's disease, and tuberous sclerosis. Other possibilities include chromosomal disorders such as Down syndrome, Klinefelter syndrome, XYY syndrome and fragile X syndrome. Acquired causes of tics include drug-induced tics, head trauma, encephalitis, stroke, and carbon monoxide poisoning. The symptoms of Lesch–Nyhan syndrome may also be confused with Tourette syndrome.

Tic mimickers

Chorea (disease)
Myoclonus
Dystonia
Torsion dystonia
Idiopathic dystonia

Genetic/chromosomal

Chromosomal abnormalities
Citrullinemia
Down syndrome
Duchenne muscular dystrophy
Fragile X syndrome
Pantothenate kinase-associated neurodegeneration
Huntington's disease
Klinefelter syndrome
Lesch–Nyhan syndrome
Neuroacanthocytosis
Neurodegeneration
Phenylketonuria
Schizophrenia
Tuberous sclerosis
Wilson's disease
XYY syndrome

Infectious or post-infectious

Encephalitis
Mycoplasma pneumoniae
Sydenham's chorea

Developmental

Pervasive developmental disorders
Asperger syndrome
Autism spectrum
Rett syndrome
Intellectual disability
Static encephalopathy
Stereotypic movement disorder

Toxins/insults/acquired

Carbon monoxide poisoning
Cerebral palsy
Creutzfeldt–Jakob disease
Fetal alcohol syndrome
Head trauma
Hypoglycemia
Intrauterine exposure to illicit drugs
Intrauterine infections
Mercury
Neurocutaneous syndromes
Neurosyphilis
Perinatal asphyxia
Psychogenic disease
Stroke
Wasp venom

Drugs 

 Cocaine
Levodopa (Dopar, Larodopa)
Antiepileptics Carbamazepine (Atretol, Epitol, Tegretol)
Lamotrigine (Lamictal)
 Amphetamines
 Pemoline
Phenytoin (Dilantin)
Phenobarbital
Antipsychotics (e.g.; haloperidol)

Notes

References
Black, Kevin J.   Tourette Syndrome and Other Tic Disorders. eMedicine.com March 22, 2006.

Further reading
 

Tourette syndrome